The Men's 100 metres T11 event for the 2012 Summer Paralympics took place at the London Olympic Stadium on 7 and 8 September.

Records
Prior to the competition, the existing World and Paralympic records were as follows.

Results

Round 1
7 September 2012, 12:13. Qual. rule: winner of each heat (Q) plus the 7 fastest other times (q) qualified.

Heat 1

Heat 2

Heat 3

Heat 4

Heat 5

Semifinals
8 September 2012, 12:15.  Qual. rule: winner of each heat (Q) plus best second place (q) qualified.

Heat 1

Heat 2

Heat 3

Final

 
Q = qualified by place. q = qualified by time. RR = regional record. PB = personal best. SB = seasonal best. DQ = disqualified. DNS = did not start.

References

Athletics at the 2012 Summer Paralympics
2012 in men's athletics